Our Bright Future is the eighth studio album by American singer-songwriter Tracy Chapman. It was released on November 11, 2008. The album was co-produced by Larry Klein. The album's first single "Sing For You" was released digitally on October 31. In promotion for this album, Chapman appeared on radio stations across Europe with interviews and sessions. Chapman also performed "Sing for You" on The Tonight Show with Jay Leno. A European tour in support of the disc took place through November and December 2008. A US tour was planned for January 2009 but was postponed. Chapman toured Europe again in the Summer of 2009. Our Bright Future was certified Gold in France, selling more than 200,000 copies there. It also was certified Gold in Switzerland, for sales in excess of 15,000. The album was nominated for the Grammy Award for Best Contemporary Folk Album. To date, it is Chapman's latest record.

Track listing

Personnel
Tracy Chapman – acoustic and electric guitar, vocals
Larry Goldings – keyboards
Jared Faw – piano
Steve Gadd – drums
Joe Gore – acoustic and electric guitar, keyboards
Larry Klein – bass guitar, organ
Dean Parks – guitar, clarinet, mandolin, pedal steel guitar
Joey Waronker – drums, percussion
Rock Deadrick – background vocals
Carla Kihlstedt – violin, nyckelharpa
Michael Webster – keyboards
Rob Burger – keyboards

Charts

Weekly charts

Year-end charts

Certifications

References

Tracy Chapman albums
2008 albums
Albums produced by Larry Klein
Elektra Records albums